The Kabompo River is one of the main tributaries of the upper Zambezi River. It flows entirely in Zambia, rising to the east of the source of the Zambezi, in North-Western Province along the watershed between the Zambezi and Congo river basins which also forms the border between Zambia and DR Congo. It is the second deepest river in Africa and one of the top five in the world.

Geography
The Kabompo River flows south-west through miombo woodland, then a remote Cryptosepalum dry forest ecoregion, with the West Lunga National Park on its west bank. After flowing past the town of Kabompo, it develops a swampy floodplain up to 5 km wide. The Kabompo Ferry on its lower course carries the main north–south gravel highway on the eastern side of the Zambezi. The river enters the Zambezi north of the town of Lukulu, at the north end of the Barotse Floodplain. Its main tributaries are the Western Lunga River which flows from the north, and the Dongwe River from the east.

See also 
List of rivers of Africa

References 

 
Rivers of Zambia
Tributaries of the Zambezi River
Barotse Floodplain